By Way of the Stars is a Canadian adventure television mini-series co-produced in 1992 by Sullivan Entertainment and German Beta-Taurus Kirch Group, that begins in 19th century Prussia, then travels through post-U.S. Civil War Charleston to the 'Canadas' and the West. It is a young boy's version of "Dances with Wolves". The six-hour mini-series is based on a popular German children's novel called "The Long Journey of Lukas B." The movie was produced in association with ZDF, at the time, Germany's largest Broadcaster, CBC and Disney Channel. This mini-series was filmed entirely in Uxbridge, Ontario. The production was nominated for 2 Gemini awards.

Synopsis
Set in 1865, the story is about a thirteen-year-old boy from Prussia, named Lukas, who moves to America to escape family problems and a dangerous enemy. Along his journey he meets a young girl named Ursula and the two children struggle to survive the difficult frontier lifestyle.

Cast List 
 Zachary Bennett – Lukas Bienmann
 Gema Zamprogna – Ursula von Knabig
 Christian Kohlund – Karl Bienmann
 Michael Mahonen – Ben Davis
 Hannes Jaenicke – Otto von Lebrecht
 Jan Rubeš - Nathan
 Dominique Sanda - Christina von Knabig
 Frances Bay - Annie Pyle 
 Tantoo Cardinal - Franoise
 John Neville - Professor Billby  
 R. H. Thomson - Priest
 Eric Schweig - Black Thunder
 Gordon Tootoosis - Cree Chief
 Anja Kruse - Maria Bienmann
 Dietmar Schönherr - Friedrich Brunneck
 Günther Maria Halmer - Heinrich von Knabig
 Volker Lechtenbrink - Jürgen
 Toby Proctor - Franz
 Albert Millaire - Renauld
 Miroslav Donutil - Albert

Home Media
The mini-series was released on DVD as a cut down 2-hour versions in 2005. In 2012 the full 6 hour version was released on DVD. In addition, the mini-series was also made available for streaming in the digital format on Sullivan Entertainment's Gazebo TV.

List of Awards
 2 Gemini Nominations – Best Direction in a Series (Allan King), Best Original Music Score for a Series, 1993
 Bronze Plaque Award – Columbus International Film Festival, 1993 (U.S.)

References

External links

Sullivanmovies.com - Official By Way Of The Stars Page

1990s Canadian television miniseries
1990s Canadian children's television series
1990s German television miniseries
1990s English-language films
1992 Canadian television series debuts
1992 Canadian television series endings
1992 German television series debuts
1992 German television series endings
Canadian children's adventure television series
German children's television series
Television series about teenagers
ZDF original programming